Bachia flavescens is a species of lizard in the family Gymnophthalmidae. It is found in Colombia, Venezuela, Guyana, Suriname, French Guiana, Tobago, and Brazil.

References

Bachia
Reptiles described in 1789
Taxa named by Pierre Joseph Bonnaterre